The MKE 120 mm tank gun is a Turkish 120 mm 55 caliber smoothbore gun based on CN08 120 mm gun produced by the Turkish company Mechanical and Chemical Industry Corporation, used on the Turkish Altay tank. The gun can fire ammunition with high muzzle velocity. The gun is made of chrome-plated "special steel".

Background
The MKE 120 mm gun was produced by transferring 120 mm 55 caliber smoothbore gun production technology from Hyundai WIA in South Korea through the Altay tank development project from 2008 to 2015. MKE modified the design per Altay requirements and produce the gun under license. 

The design of the tank gun is the same as CN08, but there are two differences: unlike CN08, thermal sleeve is equipped with Static Muzzle Reference System (SMRS), and Altay's turret does not have breech opening motor and automatic feeding magazine system for autoloader mechanism, so ammunition can only be loaded manually by tank crew and can fire up to 6 rounds a minute.

Ammunition
The gun can fire various types of tank ammunitions including MKE made APFSDS-T, TPCSDS-T Training and High Pressure. The gun is also able to fire Roketsan made TANOK gun-launched 120 mm laser guided anti-tank missile with range of 1-6 km. The tank gun might be able to fire 120×570 mm NATO tank ammunition.

See also
 CN08 120 mm gun: South Korean 120 mm 55-caliber smoothbore gun developed for K2 Black Panther main battle tank.

Weapons of comparable role, performance and era
 L11A5 120 mm rifled gun: British rifled equivalent, developed by Royal Armament Research and Development Established (RARDE) in 1957.
 2A46 125 mm gun: Russian 125-mm equivalent, developed by Spetstekhnika Design Bureau in 1960s.
 Rheinmetall 120 mm gun: German equivalent, developed by Rheinmetall in 1974.
 CN120-25 120 mm gun: French equivalent, developed by Établissement d'Études et de Fabrication d'Armements de Bourges (EFAB) in 1979.
 EXP-28M1 120 mm rifled tank gun: Experimental British weapon of the late 1970s/early 1980s. Was to have equipped the MBT-80.
 CN120-26 120 mm gun: French equivalent, developed by EFAB in 1980s.
 IMI 120 mm gun: Israeli equivalent, developed by Israeli Military Industries in 1988.
 OTO Breda 120 mm gun: Italian equivalent, developed by OTO Melara in 1988.
 L30A1 120 mm rifled gun: British rifled equivalent, developed by ROF Nottingham in 1989.
 JSW 120 mm gun: Japanese equivalent, developed by Japan Steel Works in 2008.
 2A82-1M 125 mm gun: New Russian 125-mm equivalent, developed by Uralvagonzavod in 2014.

References

120 mm artillery
Military equipment introduced in the 2010s
Tank guns